Pasteurella virus F108 is a temperate bacteriophage (a virus that infects bacteria) of the family Myoviridae, genus Hpunavirus. Its morphology is complex, with hexagonal head and a long contractile tail.

References 

Myoviridae